Yuke may refer to:

 Yukhoe, a variety of hoe (raw dishes in Korean cuisine) 
 A slang word for Euclid Trucks, and more broadly an articulated or off-road Dump truck, also spelled "Euc"
 Yukes, a race in the Final Fantasy Crystal Chronicles universe
 Yuke, a callsign for Union Of Yuktobania Republic people from Ace Combat series
 Patricia O'Connor (elder), née Yuke (born 1928), Australian Aboriginal elder
 Electric unicycle, a single-wheel motorized personal transporter